The 1997 NCAA Division I softball season, a play of college softball in the United States organized by the National Collegiate Athletic Association (NCAA) at the Division I level, began in February 1997.  The season progressed through the regular season, many conference tournaments and championship series, and concluded with the 1997 NCAA Division I softball tournament and 1997 Women's College World Series.  The Women's College World Series, consisting of the eight remaining teams in the NCAA Tournament and held in held in Oklahoma City at ASA Hall of Fame Stadium, ended on May 26, 1997.

Conference standings

Women's College World Series
The 1997 NCAA Women's College World Series took place from May 22 to May 26, 1997 in Oklahoma City.

Season leaders
Batting
Batting average: .539 – Kim Durce, Alcorn State Braves
RBIs: 78 – Leah Braatz, Arizona Wildcats
Home runs: 21 – Leah Braatz, Arizona Wildcats

Pitching
Wins: 45-10 – Sarah Dawson, Louisiana–Monroe Warhawks
ERA: 0.37 (13 ER/242.2 IP) – Trinity Johnson, South Carolina Gamecocks
Strikeouts: 399 – Trinity Johnson, South Carolina Gamecocks

Records
NCAA Division I season hits:
132 – Alison McCutcheon, Arizona Wildcats

Freshman single game stolen bases:
6 – Kathy Ching, Yale Bulldogs; April 6, 1997

Sophomore single game stolen bases:
7 – Lisa Guillory, Nicholls State Colonels; February 20, 1997

Freshman class stolen bases:
64 – Kathy Ching, Yale Bulldogs

Senior class doubles:
27 – Sara Pickering, Washington Huskies

Senior class shutouts:
31 – Sarah Dawson, Louisiana–Monroe Warhawks

Senior class innings pitched:
400.2 – Sarah Dawson, Louisiana–Monroe Warhawks

Team batting average:
.439 – Alcorn State Braves

Awards
Honda Sports Award Softball:
Trinity Johnson, South Carolina Gamecocks

All America Teams
The following players were members of the All-American Teams.

First Team

Second Team

Third Team

References